GAL-021 is a drug related to almitrine which acts as a respiratory stimulant, with its mechanism of action primarily thought to involve blocking the BKCa potassium channel, although secondary mechanisms may also be involved. It was developed by Galleon Pharmaceuticals, and is being tested in clinical trials for potential uses in post-operative care, as well as more generally to counteract the respiratory depression which can be a side effect of opioid analgesic drugs.

See also 
 BIMU8
 CX717

References 

Experimental drugs
Respiratory agents
Triazines
Hydroxylamines
Propyl compounds